Gregory Nicotero (born March 15, 1963) is an American special make-up effects creator, television producer, and director. His first major job in special effects makeup was on the George A. Romero film Day of the Dead (1985), under the tutelage of Romero and make-up effects veteran Tom Savini.

In 1988, along with Robert Kurtzman and Howard Berger, he formed KNB EFX Group, a special make-up effects studio which has gone on to work on over 400 film and television projects. KNB has won numerous awards, including an Emmy Award in 2001 for their work on the 2000 Sci Fi Channel miniseries Frank Herbert's Dune and an Academy Award in 2006 for achievement in makeup for The Chronicles of Narnia: The Lion, the Witch and the Wardrobe.

He served as an executive producer, special make-up effects supervisor, and primary director on the AMC TV series The Walking Dead and Fear the Walking Dead. Nicotero has directed 37 episodes of The Walking Dead and is the creator of the webseries The Walking Dead: Webisodes.

Life and career

Nicotero claims he began taking an interest in special effects after viewing the film Jaws. He explains: "I kept thinking 'How the hell did they do that?! How'd they build a big giant shark that could eat people?!' So, between that movie, The Exorcist, Planet of the Apes, and of course all of the Universal horror movies [...] I think Jaws and then later Dawn of the Dead were pretty much the two movies that did it for me." Nicotero began his career working in Pittsburgh, Pennsylvania, learning the trade of special make-up effects, also known as prosthetic makeup, from Tom Savini, an award-winning special effects and makeup artist, and helping on films by director George A. Romero.

While working on the 1985 Romero film Day of the Dead, he met Howard Berger, who would become one of his partners at KNB EFX Group. Nicotero relocated to Hollywood and moved in with Berger and Robert Kurtzman.

He later worked as FX artist on the 2010 film Predators and created a classic predator figure for the film.

Nicotero worked as special make-up effects supervisor, co-executive producer and occasional director for the TV series The Walking Dead, as well as acting in a few uncredited cameos. He was at the San Diego Comic-Con International for the show. He was a guest on Talking Dead on March 24, 2013, October 12, 2014, February 8, 2015, and February 14, 2016. He also supervises the make-up effects for Fear the Walking Dead.

In 2011, Nicotero was interviewed for the 2012 zombie special effects book "Blood Splatter: A Guide to Cinematic Zombie Violence, Gore and Special Effects" by author Craig W. Chenery.

He was a guest on the MythBusters Zombie Special on October 17, 2013.

Filmography
 Once Upon a Time in Hollywood (2019) (makeup effects designer and supervisor)
 Suicide Squad (2016) (special make-up effects)
 The Hateful Eight (2015) (special make-up effects)
 Fear The Walking Dead (2015) (special make-up effects) (as Greg Nicotero)
 Lone Survivor (2013) (special make-up effects)
 The Green Inferno (2013) (special makeup effects artist) (as Gregory Nicotero)
 Oz the Great and Powerful (2013) (special make-up effects)
 The Man with the Iron Fists (2012) (special make-up effects)
 Seven Psychopaths (2012) (special make-up effects)
 The Odd Life of Timothy Green (2012) (key special makeup effects supervisor)
 The Grey (2012) (special makeup effects) (as Greg Nicotero)
 A Very Harold & Kumar 3D Christmas (2011) (key special makeup effects supervisor)
 Breaking Bad (2011) (special makeup effects) (2 episodes) (as Greg Nicotero)
 Water for Elephants (2011) (key special makeup effects supervisor – uncredited)
 I Am Number Four (2011) (special makeup creator/designer) (as Greg Nicotero)
 Paul (2011) (special makeup effects artist – uncredited)
 The Boy Who Cried Werewolf (2011) (special makeup and creature effects) (TV film)
 The United Monster Talent Agency (2010) (special makeup effects) (as Greg Nicotero) (short film)
 The Ward (2010) (makeup effects)
 Piranha 3D (2010) (key special makeup effects supervisor)
 The Walking Dead (2010-2022) (special makeup effects) (as Greg Nicotero)
 The Pacific (2010) (key special makeup effects supervisor) (6 episodes)
 Predators (2010) (special makeup and creature effects)
 Edge of Darkness (2010) (special makeup effects) (as Greg Nicotero)
 The Book of Eli (2010) (special makeup effects) (as Greg Nicotero)
 Mirrors (2008) (special makeup effects designer)
 Fear Itself (2008) (special makeup effects artist) (as Greg Nicotero)
 The Mist (2007) (creature effects)
 Diary of the Dead (2007) (special effects makeup producer)
 Underdog (2007) (supervisor)
 Transformers (2007) (animatronics supervisor/puppeteer)
 Grindhouse (2007) (special makeup effects artist)
 Disturbia (2007) (special makeup effects supervisor)
 Spider-Man 3 (2007) (special effects makeup)
 The Reaping (2007) (supervisor: K.N.B. EFX Group, Inc.)
 Hostel: Part II (2007) (special makeup effects designer and creator)
 The Hills Have Eyes 2 (2007) (special makeup effects designer)
 Death Proof (2007) (special makeup effects)
 Dead and Deader (2006) (additional special makeup effects)
 Comedy Hell (2006) (special makeup designer) (as Greg Nicotero)
 The Return (2006) (special effects makeup) (as Greg Nicotero)
 The Texas Chainsaw Massacre: The Beginning (2006) (special makeup supervisor) (as Greg Nicotero)
 Casino Royale (2006) (effects supervisor) (as Greg Nicotero)
 Desperation (2006) (TV) (special makeup effects supervisor)
 Poseidon (2006) (makeup effects supervisor)
 The Hills Have Eyes (2006) (special makeup effects designer) (as Greg Nicotero)
 The Chronicles of Narnia: The Lion, the Witch and the Wardrobe (2005) (special makeup and creatures)
 Hostel (2005) (special makeup effects designer and creator)
 Serenity (2005) (special effects makeup supervisor) (as Greg Nicotero)
 The Island (project supervisor)
 Land of the Dead (2005) (special makeup effects supervisor) (as Greg Nicotero)
 The Adventures of Sharkboy and Lavagirl in 3-D (2005) (special makeup effects artist) (as Greg Nicotero)
 The Amityville Horror (2005) (special makeup effects artist, designer and creator) (as Greg Nicotero)
 Sin City (2005) (special makeup effects supervisor) (as Greg Nicotero)
 Cursed (2005) (additional special makeup effects supervisor and additional werewolf effects creator) (as Greg Nicotero)
 Masters of Horror (2005) TV Series (special makeup effects artist)
 Dominion: Prequel to the Exorcist (2005) (special makeup effects designer) (as Greg Nicotero)
 Lemony Snicket's A Series of Unfortunate Events (2004) (special effects supervisor) (as Greg Nicotero)
 Ray (2004) (special makeup effects supervisor) (as Greg Nicotero)
 Riding the Bullet (2004) (special makeup effects supervisor)
 Ginger Snaps 2: Unleashed (2004) (special makeup effects)
 Kill Bill: Volume 2 (2004) (special makeup supervisor) (as Greg Nicotero)
 Kill Bill: Volume 1 (2003) (special effects makeup supervisor)
 Once Upon a Time in Mexico (2003) (special makeup effects supervisor) (as Greg Nicotero)
 Identity (2003) (special makeup effects supervisor)
 The Texas Chainsaw Massacre (2003) (special effects makeup)
 Spy Kids 3-D: Game Over (2003) (special effects makeup)
 Hulk (2003) (animatronics effects supervisor/puppeteer) (as Greg Nicotero)
 Cabin Fever (2003) (special makeup effects supervisor)
 Bubba Ho-tep (2002) (special effects makeup supervisor) (as Greg Nicotero)
 Murder by Numbers (2002) (supervisor) (as Greg Nicotero)
 The Rules of Attraction (2002) (special makeup effects artist)
 Vampires: Los Muertos (2002) (special makeup effects supervisor)
 Austin Powers in Goldmember (2002) (character prosthetics supervisor) (as Greg Nicotero) (special makeup effects artist)
 Minority Report (2002) (special makeup effects artist) (uncredited)
 The Time Machine (2002) (supervisor) (as Greg Nicotero)
 Evolution (2001) (supervisor) (as Greg Nicotero)
 Vanilla Sky (2001) (special makeup effects supervisor) (as Greg Nicotero)
 Thirteen Ghosts (2001) (special makeup effects artist and supervisor)
 Ghosts of Mars (2001) (special makeup effects artist)
 Mulholland Drive (2001) (special makeup effects artist) (as Greg Nicotero)
 The Animal (2001) (special makeup effects artist) (as Greg Nicotero)
 Spy Kids (2001) (makeup effects supervisor and creature effects) (as Greg Nicotero)
 Unbreakable (2000) (special makeup effects supervisor) (as Greg Nicotero)
 The Cell (2000) (prosthetics and special makeup effects supervisor)
 Frank Herbert's Dune (2000) (mini) TV Series (lead special effects supervisor)
 Little Nicky (2000) (special makeup and creature effects supervisor)
 House on Haunted Hill (1999) (special makeup effects)
 The Haunting (1999) (special makeup effects supervisor) (as Greg Nicotero)
 The Green Mile (1999) (special makeup effects supervisor) (as Greg Nicotero)
 The Faculty (1998) (special makeup and creature effects)
 Very Bad Things (1998) (supervisor) (as Greg Nicotero)
 Vampires (1998) (special makeup effects)
 Scream 2 (1997) (special makeup effects supervisor) (as Greg Nicotero)
 Wishmaster (1997) (special makeup effects)
 Boogie Nights (1997) (special makeup effects supervisor) (as Greg Nicotero)
 Spawn (1997) (animatronic creature and special makeup effects)
 Jingle All the Way (1996) (Turboman costume and special makeup effects) (as Greg Nicotero)
 Scream (1996) (special makeup effects supervisor) (as Greg Nicotero)
 From Dusk till Dawn (1996) (makeup effects supervisor) (as Greg Nicotero)
 Eraser (1996) (animatronic crocodiles supervisor) (as Greg Nicotero)
 Lord of Illusions (1995) (special makeup effects supervisor)
 In the Mouth of Madness (1995) (special makeup effects)
 Vampire in Brooklyn (1995) (special makeup effects: puppeteer)
 Wes Craven's New Nightmare (1994) (special makeup effects)
 Pulp Fiction (1994) (special makeup supervisor) (uncredited)
 Pumpkinhead II: Blood Wings (1994) (special makeup effects supervisor)
 Jason Goes to Hell: The Final Friday (1993) (effects supervisor and special makeup effects artist)
 Body Bags (1993) (TV) (special makeup effects) (as Greg Nicotero)
 Army of Darkness (1992) (special makeup effects)
 The People Under the Stairs (1991) (special makeup effects supervisor)
 Dances with Wolves (1990) (buffalo effects supervisor) (as Greg Nicotero)
 Misery (1990) (special makeup effects artist) (as Greg Nicotero)
 Bride of Re-Animator (1990) (special makeup effects artist)
 Tales from the Darkside: The Movie (1990) (special makeup effects supervisor)
 Leatherface: The Texas Chainsaw Massacre III (1990) (makeup artist)
 Halloween 5: The Revenge of Michael Myers (1989) (special effects supervisor) (as Greg Nicotero)
 DeepStar Six (1989) (Creature supervisor) (as Greg Nicotero)
 The Horror Show (1989) (special effects)
 Monkey Shines (1988) (special makeup effects artist)
 Phantasm II (1988) (special makeup effects constructor and special effects crew)
 Evil Dead II (1987) (special makeup effects unit crew)
 Predator (1987) (creature effects crew) (uncredited)
 Creepshow 2 (1987) (special effects)
 Invasion U.S.A. (1985) (additional special effects makeup) (as Greg Nicotero)
 Day of the Dead (1985) (special makeup effects artist)

Actor 
 The Walking Dead
 1.3 "Tell It to the Frogs" (uncredited) .... Walker Eating Deer
 1.4 "Vatos" (uncredited) .... Walker biting Amy
 3.9 "The Suicide King" (uncredited) .... Walker in Woodbury
 6.3 "Thank You" (uncredited) .... Walker in herd
 The Grey   (2011)  .... Duke Chavis 
 Piranha 3D (2010) .... Boat Captain
 Inglourious Basterds (2009) (uncredited) .... Gestapo Major
 Gingerdead Man 2: Passion of the Crust (2008) .... Makeup Effects Guy #3
 Diary of the Dead (2008) (as Greg Nicotero) .... Zombie Surgeon
 Cemetery Gates (2006) .... Stoner Dude Michael
 The Hills Have Eyes (2006) (as Greg Nicotero) .... Cyst
 Land of the Dead (2005) (as Greg Nicotero) .... Bridgekeeper Zombie
 Cursed (2005) (uncredited) .... Man pushing Dracula's coffin
 House on Haunted Hill (1999) (uncredited) .... Rollercoaster technician
 From Dusk till Dawn (1996) .... Sex Machine's Buddy
 The Demolitionist (1995) .... Elevator Punk
 Body Bags (1993) (TV) (as Greg Nicotero) .... Man with Dog
 Halloween 4: The Return of Michael Myers (1988) (uncredited) .... Guy in Gas Station
 Intruder (1989) .... Townie in Car
 Night of the Creeps (1986) (uncredited) .... Extra
 Day of the Dead (1985) .... Johnson

Director
 The Walking Dead (2011–2022) (37 episodes)
 2.11 "Judge, Jury, Executioner"
 3.05 "Say the Word"
 3.11 "I Ain't a Judas"
 3.15 "This Sorrowful Life"
 4.01 "30 Days Without an Accident"
 4.09 "After"
 4.15 "Us"
 5.01 "No Sanctuary"
 5.09 "What Happened and What's Going On"
 5.12 "Remember"
 5.16 "Conquer"
 6.01 "First Time Again"
 6.09 "No Way Out"
 6.12 "Not Tomorrow Yet"
 6.16 "Last Day on Earth"
 7.01 "The Day Will Come When You Won't Be"
 7.02 "The Well"
 7.09 "Rock in the Road"
 7.12 "Say Yes"
 7.16 "The First Day of the Rest of Your Life"
 8.01 "Mercy"
 8.03 "Monsters"
 8.09 "Honor"
 8.12 "The Key"
 8.16 "Wrath"
 9.01 "A New Beginning"
 9.05 "What Comes After"
 9.09 "Adaptation"
 9.16 "The Storm"
 10.01 "Lines We Cross"
 10.02 "We Are the End of the World"
 10.12 "Walk with Us"
 10.16 "A Certain Doom"
11.05 "Out of the Ashes"
11.06 "On the Inside"
11.17 "Lockdown"
11.24 "Rest in Peace"
 The Walking Dead: The Oath (2013) (3 webisodes)
 The Walking Dead: Cold Storage (2012) (4 webisodes)
 The Walking Dead: Torn Apart (2011) (6 webisodes)
 The United Monster Talent Agency (2010) (short film)

References

External links
 
 Interview with Nicotero
 FanGirl Magazine Interview Pt 1
 FanGirl Magazine Interview Pt 2
 HorrorHound Convention Report
 Greg Nicotero at FEARnet

1963 births
Living people
American male film actors
American television directors
American make-up artists
Animatronic engineers
Best Makeup BAFTA Award winners
Emmy Award winners
Male actors from Pittsburgh
Sewickley Academy alumni
Special effects people